Antonio Rivera Quirino Sr. (January 20, 1906 – January 3, 1992) was a Filipino judge, entrepreneur and politician. He was the youngest brother of President Elpidio Quirino. He helped develop Alto Broadcasting System (ABS) before it was absorbed by Chronicle Broadcasting Network (CBN) to form ABS-CBN.

Early life and education 
Quirino was born on January 20, 1906. He graduated from the University of the Philippines College of Law and was a member of the Upsilon Sigma Phi.

Political career 
Quirino ran for senate spot in 1951 under the Liberal banner, but lost and placed 13th (as then senate needs only top 8). He ran in 1957 under his own wing of the party, but also lost and placed 5th and he lost to Carlos P. Garcia and placed 5th in the canvassing.

1948 Hukbalahap amnesty
In 1948, Quirino convinced Hukbalahap leader Luis Taruc to present himself to President Elpidio Quirino. Taruc agreed and the Philippine government granted an amnesty to the Hukbalahap and the Pambansang Kaisahan ng mga Magbubukid (PKM). The government agreed go the Hukbalahap's terms, giving the group a fifty-day amnesty to let them give up their weapons in exchange for certain provisions. Three hours after the amnesty period ended, government troops attacked Taruc's group, who accused the government of bad faith. One of the provisions was to forbid the United States to maintain military bases on Philippine soil, which the government did not accept.

Philippine television
Quirino established the first television station in the Philippines primarily to support the reelection campaign of his brother, President Elpidio Quirino, for the 1953 election. The station was DZAQ-TV of Alto Broadcasting System, a predecessor network company of ABS-CBN. The first telecast of DZAQ-TV was aired on October 23, 1953 and was that of a party of Antonio in which his brother, Elpídio, became the first Filipino president to appear on television, though the broadcast did not end in an appeal by Antonio for the audience to vote to reelect his brother.

Personal life
Quiríno was the youngest male in a brood of six children. In 1938, he married Aleli Aguilar De Guzman. The couple had seven children.

References

1906 births
1992 deaths
ABS-CBN executives
Filipino judges
Filipino television company founders